"Juliet" is a 1983 single by British singer-songwriter Robin Gibb, from his second solo album How Old Are You?. The song was a huge hit in various countries in Europe, hitting the No. 1 spot in Germany, Italy and Switzerland and peaking at No. 2 in Austria. In addition, the single was certified gold by the German Bundesverband Musikindustrie in 1983. A music video was also made for this song.

Charts and certifications

Weekly charts

Year-end charts

Certifications

References

1983 songs
1983 singles
Robin Gibb songs
British new wave songs
Songs written by Robin Gibb
Songs written by Maurice Gibb
Song recordings produced by Robin Gibb
Song recordings produced by Maurice Gibb
Number-one singles in Germany
Number-one singles in Italy
Number-one singles in Switzerland
Polydor Records singles